Alois Bunjira (born 29 March 1975) is a Zimbabwean former international footballer who played as a midfielder.

Career
Born in Chitungwiza, Bunjira played for Darryn Textiles, Blackpool, CAPS United, QwaQwa Stars, Bidvest Wits, Mamelodi Sundowns, Jomo Cosmos and FC AK.

He played for Zimbabwe between 1994 and 2001.

References

1975 births
Living people
Zimbabwean footballers
Zimbabwean expatriate footballers
Motor Action F.C. players
CAPS United players
Free State Stars F.C. players
Bidvest Wits F.C. players
Mamelodi Sundowns F.C. players
Jomo Cosmos F.C. players
F.C. AK players
Association football midfielders
Zimbabwean expatriate sportspeople in South Africa
Expatriate soccer players in South Africa
2004 African Cup of Nations players
Zimbabwe international footballers